Port(s) of Call may refer to:

 Port of call (nautical term), an intermediate stop for a ship on its sailing itinerary

Film
 Ports of Call (film), a 1925 American silent film
 Port of Call (1948 film), a Swedish film by Ingmar Bergman
 Port of Call (2015 film), a Hong Kong film by Philip Yung

Literature
 Ports of Call (Maalouf novel), a 1991 novel by Amin Maalouf
 Ports of Call (Vance novel), a 1998 novel by Jack Vance

Music
 Ports of Call, or Escales, a 1922 orchestral suite by Jacques Ibert
 "Port of Call", a 1996 song by Porter Ricks from Biokinetics

Other uses
 Ports of Call (video game), a 1987 business simulation game
 Denver Ports of Call, a defunct United States private airline

See also